Amorbia vero is a species of moth of the family Tortricidae. It is found in southern Florida.

References

External links

Moths described in 2012
Sparganothini
Moths of North America